Renick Farm, also known as the William Renick Farm, is an historic home located near Renick, Greenbrier County, West Virginia. The farmhouse was built between 1787 and 1792, and is a two-story, limestone dwelling with a gable roof in the Georgian style. A brick Federal style addition was built in 1825, and it features a two-story, temple form entrance portico with Doric order columns and Chinese Chippendale railings.  Also on the property are a contributing barn (1901) and smoke house (c. 1840).

It was listed on the National Register of Historic Places in 1997.

References

External links

Farms on the National Register of Historic Places in West Virginia
Federal architecture in West Virginia
Georgian architecture in West Virginia
Historic American Buildings Survey in West Virginia
Houses in Greenbrier County, West Virginia
Houses completed in 1792
Houses on the National Register of Historic Places in West Virginia
National Register of Historic Places in Greenbrier County, West Virginia
Stone houses in West Virginia